Majid Hossein Tikdarinejad  (born 6 September 1982) is an Iranian professional futsal player.

Honours

Country 
 AFC Futsal Championship
 Champion (1): 2005
 Asian Indoor Games
 Champion (1): 2005
 Confederations Cup
 Champion (1): 2009
 WAFF Futsal Championship
 Champion (1): 2012

Club 
AFC Futsal Club Championship
 Runners-up (1): 2011 (Shahid Mansouri) 
 Iranian Futsal Super League
 Champion (2): 2010–11 (Shahid Mansouri) - 2011–12 (Shahid Mansouri)
 Runners-up (1): 2013-14 (Giti Pasand)

References

Iranian men's futsal players
1982 births
Living people
Tam Iran Khodro FSC players
Esteghlal FSC players
Shahid Mansouri FSC players
Giti Pasand FSC players
Iranian expatriate futsal players

People from Kerman Province
21st-century Iranian people